The Murder of William Condon is an Australian crime that occurred in 1952. Northern Territory policeman Willian Condon was shot and killed in Katherine on 9 June 1952 by Terence Charles Stapleton. Stapleton was acquitted on grounds of insanity.

References

External links
Murder of William Condon at NT Police

Murder in the Northern Territory